is a dating sim video game developed and published by Konami. The first game in the Tokimeki Memorial series, it was first released for the PC Engine's Super CD-ROM² System on May 27, 1994. It was directed by Yoshiaki Nagata, with Koji Igarashi working on scenario writing. It later received ports to the PlayStation in 1995, Sega Saturn and Super Famicom in 1996, Windows in 1997, Game Boy Color in 1999, mobile phones in 2004, and PlayStation Portable in 2006.

The game is considered one of the major titles in the dating sim genre, and eschews the sexual content of other games in the genre.

Gameplay

Tokimeki Memorial is a dating sim game in which the player controls a male freshman from Kirameki High School. The game is particularly notable for its "bomb" feature, where neglected, infrequently-dated girls would eventually become angry and gossip to their friends, severely reducing love meters across the board. In the middle of the game, when the number of known girls is high, these "bombs" became the primary concern of the player, forcing careful planning and strategies like round-robin dating. Although the feature was still present in the later games, these games considerably reduced its importance and the difficulty in avoiding it.

Players pick options as responses when prompted by the characters in the game.

Development 
The dating simulator genre was preceded by the raising simulation genre best codified by the Princess Maker series by Gainax, which focused on child raising rather than dating.

Writer Koji Igarashi says when he was tasked with writing the story for the game, he got assistance from his girlfriend at the time, who would later become his wife. She gave him advice on how to write the story to the game, while he would play Castlevania: Rondo of Blood, the game she was working on at the time. Igarashi requested to not work on a sequel to the game, and instead was allowed to request to work on the next Castlevania game instead.

The goal of the developers was to hearken back to high school days. Konami director Akihiko Nagata said "the person who created the game wanted to have experiences like this back in his high school days".

Release history

The original was released for the PC Engine in 1994. It was remade as Tokimeki Memorial: Forever With You on the PlayStation (1995), Sega Saturn (1996) and PC (1997) with a new opening video, improved graphics and sound, and new minigames.

In 1996, it was ported to the Super Famicom as Tokimeki Memorial: Densetsu no Ki no Shita de, and although drastically reduced in graphic and sound quality (the only voice clips were available during loading), included an exclusive CD with a radio drama and new arrangement of the ending theme, "Futari no Toki", this time sung by the majority of the girls, instead of just Shiori Fujisaki (the heroine of the first game). A fan translation of this version into English, re-titled Heartthrob Memorial: Under the Tree of Legends, was released in March 2022.

In 1999, the game was ported again to the Game Boy Color in two versions, Tokimeki Memorial Sports Version: Kotei no Photograph and Tokimeki Memorial Culture Version: Komorebi no Melody, dividing 10 of the characters between the two games and adding three new winnable characters, Patricia McGrath, Naomi Munakata, and Kyoko Izumi. The Game Boy Color versions also featured a Beatmania mini-game, compatibility with the Super Game Boy, a screen saver mode, and a two-player versus minigame. The game received a sequel the same year.

Konami announced a mobile game version of Tokimeki Memorial for the i-mode mobile platform in 1999, and it was expected to release in January 2000. In 2004, Tokimeki Memorial was released for mobile phones in Japan, and in 2006, was ported to the PlayStation Portable portable system, which is virtually identical to the PlayStation version. In 2009, the PlayStation version of Tokimeki Memorial: Forever With You was released on the Japanese PlayStation Store to celebrate the franchise's 15th anniversary.

In 2017, the mobile game Tokimeki Idol was released.

Reception
Tokimeki Memorial sold 1.1 million copies by 1996.

The game, a classic of the dating sim genre, was voted as the 23rd Favorite video game of all-time in a 2006 reader poll by Japanese magazine Famitsu.

Tokimeki Memorial popularized the use of social statistics-raising mechanics in games for following decades. The game became more well-known in English-speaking communities after a video essay by Tim Rogers gained attention, and a fan translation of the Super Famicom port was published.

References

External links 

 

Tokimeki Memorial
1994 video games
Game Boy Color games
Japan-exclusive video games
Mobile games
PlayStation (console) games
PlayStation Network games
PlayStation Portable games
Sega Saturn games
Super Nintendo Entertainment System games
TurboGrafx-CD games
Video games developed in Japan
Video games scored by Miki Higashino
Windows games